| tries = {{#expr:

 +  5 + 6 + 1 + 5  + 5 + 5  + 6 + 5 + 3  + 6
 +  1 + 4 + 1 + 3  + 3 + 2  + 4 + 1 + 4  + 3
 +  4 + 2 + 6 + 2  + 4 + 3  + 4 + 2 + 8  + 2
 +  5 + 4 + 2 + 10 + 3 + 2  + 6 + 0 + 11 + 4
 +  4 + 2 + 8 + 2  + 9 + 12 + 4 + 6 + 2  + 10
 + 10 + 2 + 4 + 10 + 2 + 5  + 4 + 4 + 5  + 6
 + 2 + 5 + 1 + 4
 + 1 + 2
 + 4
}}
| top point scorer = Ian Madigan (Leinster)(113 points)
| top try scorer = George North (Northampton Saints)(7 tries)
| venue = Twickenham Stadium, London
| attendance2 = 
| champions =  Toulon
| count = 3
| runner-up =  Clermont
| website = http://www.epcrugby.com
| previous year = 2013–14
| previous tournament = 2013–14 Heineken Cup
| next year = 2015–16
| next tournament = 2015–16 European Rugby Champions Cup
}}

The 2014–15 European Rugby Champions Cup was the first season of the European Rugby Champions Cup (20th overall), the annual rugby union club competition for teams from the top six nations in European rugby, and the 20th season of professional European rugby union in total. It replaced the Heineken Cup as Europe's top-tier competition for rugby clubs. The competition got underway on the weekend of 17 October 2014 with the first round of the pool stage, and ended with the final on 2 May 2015 at Twickenham Stadium, London, England.

Toulon were the champions having beaten Clermont 24–18 in a repeat of the 2013 Heineken Cup Final. Toulon retained their title for the second consecutive year, the first team to win three European titles in a row.

Teams
20 clubs, from the three major European domestic leagues, will compete in the Champions Cup:
 England: 7 clubs
 The top 6 clubs in the Aviva Premiership. (6 clubs)
 There was a seventh club from England, after Wasps won the 7th Place play-off for entry into the European Rugby Champions Cup. (1 club)
 France: 6 clubs, based on performance in the Top 14.
 Ireland, Italy, Scotland & Wales: 7 clubs, based on performance in the Pro12.
 The best placed club from each nation (4 clubs)
 The 3 highest ranked clubs not qualified thereafter (3 clubs)

The following clubs qualified for the competition:

20th Team play-off

The following teams took part in the play-off for the final place in the Champions Cup, having finished 7th in their respective leagues.

This play-off took place over two legs, on the weekends of 17/18 May and 24/25 May, with a draw being used to determine home advantage for each leg.
The draw took place on 6 May 2014, in Heathrow. Following the draw, the fixtures were announced as follows:

Wasps won the play-off 50–35 on aggregate and qualified for the Champions Cup.

Team details
Below is the list of coaches, captain and stadiums with their method of qualification for each team.

Note: Placing shown in brackets, denotes standing at the end of the regular season for their respective leagues, with their end of season positioning shown through CH for Champions, RU for Runner-up, SF for losing Semi-finalist and QF for losing Quarter-finalist.

Seeding
The 20 competing teams were seeded and split into four tiers; seeding was based on performance in their respective domestic leagues.

For the purpose of creating the tiers, Aviva Premiership clubs were ranked only according to their finishing positions in the League table, and not based on performance in the knockout phase of the season, while Top 14 and Pro12 clubs were ranked based on their League performances and on their qualification for the knockout phases of their championships, so a losing quarter-finalist in the Top 14 would be seeded below a losing semi-finalist, even if they finished above them in the regular season.

Teams were taken from a league and put into a tier; a draw was used to allocate two second seeds to Tier 1, the remaining team went into Tier 2. This allocation then determined which fourth seeded team entered Tier 2, while the others entered Tier 3.

As with the previous European competition, the Heineken Cup, teams from the same country were kept apart where possible. However, as 7 teams qualified from England, 2 pools would by necessity contain two English teams and as 6 French teams qualified, there would be one pool with two French teams.  Sale Sharks and Wasps would be drawn into pools which contained one other Aviva Premiership club, and Toulouse would be drawn into a pool which contained one other Top 14 club.

The brackets show each team's seeding and their league (for example, 1 Top 14 indicates the team was seeded 1st from the Top 14).

Pool stage

The draw took place on 10 June 2014, at the Stade de la Maladière in Neuchâtel.

Fixtures were announced on Thursday 14 August 2014 at 2pm.

Teams played each other twice, both at home and away, in the group stage, that began on the weekend of 17/18/19 October 2014, and continued through to 23/24/25 January 2015, before the pool winners and three best runners-up progressed to the quarter finals.

Teams were awarded competition points, based on match result. Teams receive 4 points for a win, 2 points for a draw, 1 attacking bonus point for scoring four or more tries in a match and 1 defensive bonus point for losing a match by seven points or fewer.

In the event of a tie between two or more teams, the following tie-breakers were used, as directed by EPCR:
 Where teams have played each other
 The club with the greater number of competition points from only matches involving tied teams.
 If equal, the club that scored the most tries in those matches.
 If equal, the club with the best aggregate points difference from those matches.
 Where teams remain tied and/or have not played each other in the competition (i.e. are from different pools)
 The club with the best aggregate points difference from the pool stage.
 If equal, the club that scored the most tries in the pool stage.
 If equal, the club with the fewest players suspended in the pool stage.
 If equal, the drawing of lots will determine a club's ranking.

Pool 1

Pool 2

Pool 3

Pool 4

Pool 5

Seeding and runners-up

Knock-out stage
The eight qualifiers were seeded according to performance in the pool stage, and competed in the quarter-finals, which were held on the weekend of 3–5 April 2015. The four top seeds hosted the quarter-finals against the lower seeds, in a 1v8, 2v7, 3v6 and 4v5 format.

The semi-finals were played on the weekend of 18–19 April 2015.

The winners of the semi-finals will contest the final, at Twickenham Stadium, on 2 May 2015.

Bracket

Quarter-finals

Semi-finals

Final

See also
2014–15 European Rugby Challenge Cup

Notes

References

 
Champions Cup
European Rugby Champions Cup
European Rugby Champions Cup
European Rugby Champions Cup
European Rugby Champions Cup
European Rugby Champions Cup
European Rugby Champions Cup
European Rugby Champions Cup
European Rugby Champions Cup seasons